Daqiao is a town in Jiangshan, Quzhou, Zhejiang province, China. , it has 15 villages under its administration.

See also 
 List of township-level divisions of Zhejiang

References 

Township-level divisions of Zhejiang
Jiangshan